Phulwari ki Nal Wildlife Sanctuary is in Udaipur District of Rajasthan, in the southern Aravalli Hills bordering the state of Gujarat, India. It was declared a Wildlife Sanctuary on 6 October 1983 by the Government of Rajasthan.

Geography 
The area of the Phulwari ki Nal Wildlife Sanctuary is 511.41 km2., of which 365.92 km2 is Reserved Forest and 145.49 km2 is Protected Forests.  The  sanctuary is spread over Kotra and Jhadol tehsils of Udaipur district. There are 134 villages present inside the sanctuary. Elevation of the terrain within the sanctuary varies from 600–900 m above MSL. The climate in the sanctuary is classified as semi-arid, with an annual rainfall of 730 mm.

The Government of India published a draft notification on 31 August 2015 stating the intent to declare an area of up to 7.5 km from the outer boundaries of the sanctuary as an Eco-Sensitive Zone. As of 26 March 2019, the draft notification had not been finalized.

Wildlife 
Wild animals observed in the Phulwari ki Nal Wildlife Sanctuary include large-tailed nightjar, flying squirrel, three-striped palm squirrel, Asian chameleons, Indian star tortoise, mouse deer, four-horned antelope, and panther.

Facilities 
The Phulwari ki Nal Wildlife Sanctuary is administered out of headquarters located in Kotra, Udaipur District, Rajasthan. There are three rest houses located inside and around the sanctuary, at Mamer, Panarwa, and Kotra.

References

Further reading
 

Udaipur district
Tourist attractions in Udaipur district
Wildlife sanctuaries in Rajasthan
1983 establishments in Rajasthan
Protected areas established in 1983